Hainersdorf may refer to:

 Hainersdorf (Sebnitz), a village in the municipality of Sebnitz, Saxony, Germany
 Hainersdorf (Styria), a municipality in the province of Styria, Austria